American Methods is a 1917 American silent drama film directed by Frank Lloyd and starring William Farnum, Jewel Carmen and Bertram Grassby.

Cast
 William Farnum as William Armstrong 
 Jewel Carmen as Claire de Beaulieu 
 Bertram Grassby as Gaston - Duc de Bligny 
 Willard Louis as M. Moulinet 
 Lillian West as Marie Moulinet 
 Genevieve Blinn as Marquise de Beaulieu 
 Allan Forrest as Octave de Beaulieu 
 Florence Vidor as Betty Armstrong 
 Mortimer Jaffe as Jimmy 
 Marc B. Robbins as Henri Gaudet 
 Josef Swickard as Baron de Prefont

References

Bibliography
 Solomon, Aubrey. The Fox Film Corporation, 1915-1935: A History and Filmography. McFarland, 2011.

External links

1917 films
1917 drama films
Silent American drama films
Films directed by Frank Lloyd
American silent feature films
1910s English-language films
Fox Film films
American black-and-white films
Films based on works by Georges Ohnet
1910s American films